Phytoecia nigroapicalis is a species of beetle in the family Cerambycidae. It was described by Stephan von Breuning in 1944. It is known from Iraq.

References

Phytoecia
Beetles described in 1944